The 2011 Eastern Michigan Eagles football team represented Eastern Michigan University during the 2011 NCAA Division I FBS football season. Eastern Michigan competed as a member of the Mid-American Conference (MAC) West Division, were coached by Ron English, and played their homes game at Rynearson Stadium. They finished the season 6–6, 4–4 in MAC play to finish in a tie for fourth place in the West Division. Despite being 6–6, the Eagles were not bowl eligible because two of their wins came against FCS teams. The 6 wins were the most wins the school had since 1995 when they also had 6 wins.

Before the season

Previous season

The Eagles posted a 2–10 record in 2010, Ron English's second season as head coach, losing all four non-conference games and stretching their losing streak to 18 games before winning an overtime game at Ball State and another game at Buffalo in the latter part of the season.

Personnel

Pre-season expectations

In the 2011 Mid-American Conference media poll, the Eagles were picked to finish in last place in the West Division, where they finished the past two seasons.

Post-season honors

Following the 2011 Mid-American Conference football season, five players were named to All-MAC teams, the most for EMU since 1996, though none were named to the first team. Senior defensive lineman Brad Ohrman was named to the second team, while sixth-year senior defensive back Latarrius Thomas, junior tight end Garrett Hoskins, junior linebacker Justin Cudworth, and sophomore defensive back Marlon Pollard were all named to the third team. After leading the Eagles to their winningest season in 15 years, Ron English was named the MAC Coach of the Year.

Senior offensive lineman Bridger Buche and senior defensive lineman Brad Ohrman are considered the top pro prospects from the team.

Schedule

Game summaries

Howard

EMU's opening game was originally scheduled for 7 pm on Saturday, September 3. Due to severe storms in the area, which caused problems at football games throughout the Midwest, including the cancellation of the Western Michigan at University of Michigan game near the end of the third quarter, the kickoff was first postponed until 8:30 PM, then to 9:30 PM, and finally to noon on Sunday, with free admission offered. After a slow start by the EMU offense, which saw junior quarterback Alex Gillett throw an interception returned for a touchdown on the Eagles' first offensive play, EMU took charge of the game in the second quarter, scoring touchdowns on four of their next five drives while holding Howard to just 13 net yards on their next six possessions. EMU's offense was led by running backs Dominique Sherrer and Javonti Greene, each gained 120 yards and a touchdown in 14 carries, while Justin Cudworth led EMU's defense with 13 tackles, a sack, and a forced fumble.

Scoring Summary

1st Quarter
 10:54 Howard  – Julien David 29-yard interception return (two-point conversion failed) 0–6 Howard
 7:43 EMU – Kody Fulkerson 45-yard field goal 3–6 Howard
 2:23 Howard – Parker Munoz 39-yard field goal 3–9 Howard

2nd Quarter
 14:53 EMU – Kody Fulkerson 31-yard field goal 6–9 Howard
 11:31 EMU – Garrett Hoskins 25-yard pass from Alex Gillett (Kody Fulkerson kick) 13–9 EMU
 1:31 EMU – Javonti Greene 1-yard run (Kody Fulkerson kick) 20–9 EMU
 0:56 EMU – Alex Gillett 14-yard run (Kody Fulkerson kick) 27–9 EMU

3rd Quarter
 14:05 EMU – Dominique Sherrer 77-yard run (Kody Fulkerson kick) 34–9 EMU

4th Quarter
 3:13 EMU – Joe Fleming 9-yard pass from Alex Gillett (Kody Fulkerson kick) 41–9 EMU

Alabama State

Scoring summary

1st quarter
 2:47 EMU – Nick Olds 13-yard pass from Alex Gillett (Kody Fulkerson kick) 7–0 EMU

2nd quarter
None

3rd quarter
 11:42 EMU – Dominique Sherrer 6-yard run (Kody Fulkerson kick) 14–0 EMU
 5:18 Alabama State – T.C. McWilliams 22-yard pass from Devin Dominguez (Bobby Wenzig kick) 14–7 EMU

4th quarter
None

at Michigan

Scoring summary

1st quarter
None

2nd quarter
 14:55 EMU – Kody Fulkerson 21-yard field goal 3–0 EMU
 9:28 Michigan – Kevin Koger 9-yard pass from Denard Robinson (Brendan Gibbons kick) 3–7 Michigan
 0:39 Michigan – Denard Robinson 11-yard run (Brendan Gibbons kick) 3–14 Michigan

3rd quarter
 9:17 Michigan – Fitzgerald Toussaint 1-yard run (Brendan Gibbons kick) 3–21 Michigan
 1:05 Michigan – Drew Dileo 19-yard pass from Denard Robinson (Brendan Gibbons kick)3–28 Michigan

4th quarter
 4:32 Michigan – Brendan Gibbons 21-yard field goal 3–31 Michigan

at Penn State

Scoring summary

1st quarter
 4:18 Penn State – Anthony Fera 29-yard field goal 0–3 Penn State

2nd quarter
 8:19 Penn State – Joe Suhey 27-yard pass from Matt McGloin (Anthony Fera kick) 0–10 Penn State
 0:56 Penn State – Derek Moye 5-yard pass from Matt McGloin (Anthony Fera kick) 0–17 Penn State

3rd quarter
 13:59 Penn State – Devon Smith 71-yard pass from Rob Bolden (Anthony Fera kick) 0–24 Penn State
 2:27 Penn State – Derek Moye 20-yard pass from Matt McGloin (Anthony Fera kick) 0–31 Penn State

4th quarter
 11:50 EMU – Kody Fulkerson 21-yard field goal 3–31 Penn State
 8:32 Penn State – Sam Ficken 43-yard field goal 3–34 Penn State
 3:04 EMU – Kody Fulkerson 22-yard field goal 6–34 Penn State

Akron

EMU scored first and never trailed. The team was led by three touchdowns from walk-on running back Dominique White.

Scoring summary

1st quarter
 4:56 – Dominque White 14-yard run (Kody Fulkerson kick) 7–0 EMU
2nd quarter
 13:41 – Dominque White 1-yard run (Kody Fulkerson kick) 14–0 EMU
 5:24 – Keith Sconiers 36-yard pass from Clayton Moore (T.J. Marchese kick) 14–7 EMU
 1:57 – T.J. Marchese 29-yard field goal 14–10 EMU 
 0:00 – Kody Fulkerson 26-yard field goal 17–10 EMU
3rd quarter
 12:45 – Dominque White 2-yard run (Kody Fulkerson kick)24–10 EMU
 3:09 – Clayton Moore 8-yard pass from Jawon Chisholm (T.J. Marchese kick failed)24–16 EMU
4th quarter
 12:43 – Alex Gillett 4-yard run (Kody Fulkerson kick) 31–16 EMU
 3:18 – Jawon Chisholm 1-yard run (T.J. Marchese kick) 31–24 EMU

at Toledo

Scoring summary

1st quarter
 5:05 – Morgan Williams 19-yard pass from Austin Dantin (Ryan Casano kick) 0–7 Toledo
2nd quarter
 10:00 – Bernard Reedy 55-yard pass from Terrance Owens (Ryan Casano kick) 0–14 Toledo
 8:16 – Eric Page 85-yard punt return (Ryan Casano kick) 0–21 Toledo
 3:37 – Kody Fulkerson 48-yard field goal 3–21 Toledo
 1:22 – Kinsman Thomas 22-yard pass from Alex Gillett (Kody Fulkerson kick blocked) 9–21 Toledo
 1:22 – Desmond Marrow off a blocked extra point kick 9–23 Toledo
3rd quarter
 6:44 – Ryan Casano 19-yard field goal 9–26 Toledo
 4:13 – Kenny Stafford 2-yard pass from Terrance Owens (Ryan Casano kick) 9–33 Toledo
 0:28 – Eric Page 24-yard pass from Austin Dantin (Ryan Casano kick) 9–40 Toledo
4th quarter 
 13:59 – Morgan Williams 1-yard run (Ryan Casano kick) 9–47 Toledo
 10:11 – Dominque White 3-yard run (Kody Fulkerson kick) 16–47 Toledo
 4:40 – David Pasquale 3-yard run (Ryan Casano kick) 16–54 Toledo

at Central Michigan

Scoring summary

1st quarter
 5:18 David Harman 28-yard field goal 0–3 Central Michigan
 0:30 Dominque White 1-yard run (Kody Fulkerson kick) 7–3 EMU
2nd quarter
 5:26 David Harman 40-yard field goal 7–6 EMU
3rd quarter
 11:13 Javonti Greene 36-yard run (Kody Fulkerson kick) 14–6 EMU
 6:33 David Blackburn 8-yard pass from Ryan Radcliff (David Harman kick) 14–13 EMU
4th quarter
 14:27 Javonti Greene 2-yard run (Kody Fulkerson kick) 21–13 EMU
 12:34 Javonti Greene 5-yard run (Kody Fulkerson kick) 28–13 EMU
 3:36 Titus Davis 11-yard pass from Ryan Radcliff (David Harman kick) 28–20
 1:09 Jerry Harris 2-yard pass from Ryan Radcliff (Ryan Radcliff pass to Titus Davis for two-point conversion) 28–28
 0:37 Alex Gillett 30-yard run (Kody Fulkerson kick) 35–28

Western Michigan

Scoring summary

1st quarter
None

2nd quarter
 11:13 – Javonti Greene 50-yard pass from Alex Gillett (Kody Fulkerson kick) 7–0 EMU
3rd quarter
 12:25 – Tevin Drake 46-yard run (John Potter kick) 7–7
4th quarter
 10:59 – John Potter 37-yard field goal 7–10 Western Michigan
 7:46 – Javonti Greene 50-yard run (Kody Fulkerson kick) 14–10 EMU

Ball State

Scoring summary

1st quarter
 9:38 Torieal Gibson 94-yard pass from Keith Wenning (Steven Schott kick) 0–7 Ball State
 6:46 Trey Hunter 32-yard pass from Alex Gillett (Kody Fulkerson kick) 7–7
 4:50 Barrington Scott 8-yard pass from Keith Wenning (Steven Schott kick) 7–14 Ball State
 0:39 Nick Olds 42-yard pass from Alex Gillett (Kody Fulkerson kick) 14–14
2nd quarter
 13:23 Steven Schott 31-yard field goal 14–17 Ball State
 1:47 Tyreese Russell 14-yard pass from Alex Gillett (Kody Fulkerson kick) 21–17 EMU
 1:08 Steven Schott 29-yard field goal 21–20 EMU
3rd quarter
 9:39 Jahwan Edwards 15-yard run (Steven Schott kick) 21–27 Ball State
 0:04 Tyreese Russell 16-yard pass from Alex Gillett (Kody Fulkerson kick) 28–27 EMU
4th quarter
 6:52 Steven Schott 23-yard field goal 28–30 Ball State
 1:18 Kody Fulkerson 20-yard field goal 31–30 EMU
 0:09 Steven Schott 44-yard field goal 31–33 Ball State

Buffalo

Scoring summary

1st quarter 
 7:04 Kody Fulkerson 39-yard field goal 3–0 EMU
2nd quarter
 11:50 Garrett Hoskins 2-yard pass from Alex Gillett (Kody Fulkerson kick blocked) 9–0 EMU
 0:04 Patrick Clarke 43-yard field goal 9–3 EMU 
3rd quarter
 8:59 Branden Oliver 3-yard run (Patrick Clarke kick) 9–10 Buffalo
 8:00 Demarius Reed 67-yard pass from Alex Gillett (Kody Fulkerson kick) 16–10 EMU
 6:35 Branden Oliver 68-yard run (Patrick Clarke kick) 16–17 Buffalo
 2:24 Demarius Reed 11-yard pass from Alex Gillett (Kody Fulkerson kick)23–17 EMU
4th quarter
 14:11 Garrett Hoskins 34-yard pass from Alex Gillett (Kody Fulkerson kick) 30–17 EMU

at Kent State

Scoring summary

1st quarter
 12:33 Kody Fulkerson 27-yard field goal 3–0 EMU
 6:10 Kody Fulkerson 44-yard field goal 6–0 EMU
 1:50 Javonti Greene 32-yard run (Kody Fulkerson kick) 13–0 EMU
2nd quarter 
 7:49 Trayion Durham 1-yard run (Freddy Cortez kick) 13–7 EMU
 1:23 Spencer Keith 3-yard run (Freddy Cortez kick) 13–14 Kent State
3rd quarter
 10:49 Demarius Reed 83-yard punt return (Pat Failed) 19–14 EMU
 7:35 Freddy Cortez 35-yard field goal 19–17 EMU
 2:27 Freddy Cortez 49-yard field goal 19–20 Kent State
4th quarter
 12:59 Kody Fulkerson 40-yard field goal 22–20 EMU
 6:40 Tyshon Goode 70-yard pass from Spencer Keith (Spencer Keith pass to Tyshon Goode for two-point conversion) 22–28 Kent State

at Northern Illinois

Scoring summary

1st quarter
 10:17 Willie Clark 54-yard pass from Chandler Harnish (Mathew Sims kick) 0–7 Northern Illinois
 0:11 Kody Fulkerson 20-yard field goal 3–7 Northern Illinois
2nd quarter
 8:44 Dominique Sherrer tackled Sean Progar in end zone for a safety 3–9 Northern Illinois
 4:44 Mathew Sims 39-yard field goal 3–12 Northern Illinois
3rd quarter
 1:43 Kody Fulkerson 23-yard field goal 6–12 Northern Illinois
 0:12 Chandler Harnish 68-yard run (two-point conversion failed) 6–18 Northern Illinois
4th quarter
 6:19 Nick Olds 24-yard pass from Alex Gillett (two-point conversion failed) 12–18 Northern Illinois

References

External links

Eastern Michigan
Eastern Michigan Eagles football seasons
Eastern Michigan Eagles football